Red Hill is a borough in Montgomery County, Pennsylvania, United States. It is primarily a lakeshore, lowlands, suburban community northwest of Philadelphia in the Delaware River Valley watershed, as is the balance of its county. Its population was 2,383 at the 2010 census. 

Red Hill is served by the Upper Perkiomen School District. It is also part of the strip of small towns that run together along Route 29, Red Hill, Pennsburg, and East Greenville, colloquially known as Red Pennsville.  The town is named after the large amounts of red shale in the soil and ground layers of the hill.

History
The Red Hill Historic District was added to the National Register of Historic Places in 1985.

Geography
Red Hill is located at  (40.376288, -75.484308).

Transportation

Pennsylvania Route 29 is the only numbered highway serving Red Hill. It traverses the borough on a north-south alignment following Main Street.

Demographics

As of the 2010 census, the borough was 96.4% White, 1.4% Black or African American, 0.7% Asian, and 1.3% were two or more races. About 2.1% of the population were of Hispanic or Latino ancestry..

As of the census, of 2000, 2,196 people, 899 households, and 576 families were residing in the borough. The population density was 3,046.0 people per square mile (1,177.6/km2). The 944 housing units  averaged 1,309.4 per mi (506.2/km2). The racial makeup of the borough was 97.81% White, 0.32% African American, 0.05% Native American, 0.09% Asian, 0.37% from other races, and 1.37% from two or more races. Hispanics or Latinos of any race were 1.55% of the population.

Of the 899 households, 27.7% had children under the age of 18 living with them, 52.5% were married couples living together, 8.1% had a female householder with no husband present, and 35.9% were not families. About 30.1% of all households were made up of individuals, and 19.2% had someone living alone who was 65 years of age or older. The average household size was 2.44 and the average family size was 3.08.

In the borough, the age distribution was  23.8% under 18, 7.4% from 18 to 24, 28.4% from 25 to 44, 22.4% from 45 to 64, and 18.1% who were 65 or older. The median age was 38 years. For every 100 females, there were 91.1 males. For every 100 females age 18 and over, there were 87.2 males. The median income for a household in the borough was $45,313, and for a family was $58,529. Males had a median income of $35,857 versus $26,295 for females. The per capita income for the borough was $20,633. About 3.1% of families and 4.1% of the population were below the poverty line, including 2.3% of those under age 18 and 10.8% of those age 65 or over.

Politics and government
Red Hill has a city manager form of government with a mayor and borough council. The borough president of Red Hill is Doris Decker. 

The borough is part of Pennsylvania's 4th Congressional District (represented by Rep. Madeleine Dean), Pennsylvania's 131st Representative District (represented by Rep. Milou Mackenzie), and the 24th State Senate District (represented by Sen. Bob Mensch).

References

External links

 Borough fact sheet

Populated places established in 1836
Boroughs in Montgomery County, Pennsylvania
1836 establishments in Pennsylvania